The Boston College Eagles hockey team represented Boston College in the 2009–10 NCAA Division I women's ice hockey season. The Eagles are coached by Katie King. King is assisted by Mike Doneghey and Courtney Kennedy.

Offseason

Regular season
The Eagles competed in the Beanpot, and the Hockey East Tournament.
February 17: Allie Thunstrom of Boston College is among 45 nominees for the Patty Kazmaier Memorial Award.
In the month of February, Kiera Kingston recorded a 2-1-1 record. Her goals against average was 1.46 and she had 138 saves and recorded a save percentage of .952. Against the Boston University Terriers, she accumulated 32 saves on Feb. 9. Four days later, she stopped 36 shots from the Maine Black Bears. Of the seven goals she allowed, two were on the penalty kill.
March 23: The Eagles hosted its sixth annual sledge hockey game. Their opponent was the Massachusetts Hospital School Chariots at Kelley Rink in Chestnut Hill, Mass.
Allie Thunstrom was in her final season for Boston College. She never missed a game while competing for Boston College. She appeared in all 141 games in her four years. In her senior season (2009–10), she recorded 22 goals and seven assists. Thunstrom led the Eagles in goals and points and finished the season with the most goals scored in Hockey East.

Standings

Roster

Schedule

Player stats

Skaters

Goaltenders

Postseason

NCAA hockey tournament

Awards and honors
 Kiera Kingston, Bauer/Hockey East Goaltender of the Month, February 2010
 Ashley Motherwell, 2010 WHEA All-Rookie Team
 Allie Thunstrom, 2010 WHEA Second-Team All-Star
 Allie Thunstrom, Frozen Four Skills Competition participant

References

External links
Official Site

Boston College Eagles women's ice hockey seasons
Boston College
Boston College Eagles women's ice hockey season
Boston College Eagles women's ice hockey season
Boston College Eagles women's ice hockey season
Boston College Eagles women's ice hockey season